Li Runming  (born ) is a Chinese volleyball player. He was part of the China men's national volleyball team at the 2014 FIVB Volleyball Men's World Championship in Poland. He played for Shandong.

Clubs
 2019 GFC Ajaccio
 2007 / 2018 Shandong
 Beijing (2014 Asian Club Championship, 2018 loaned starting in the semifinal matches, 2018–present)

References

External links
 Profile at FIVB.org

1990 births
Living people
Chinese men's volleyball players
Place of birth missing (living people)
Volleyball players at the 2010 Asian Games
Volleyball players at the 2014 Asian Games
Volleyball players at the 2018 Asian Games
Asian Games competitors for China
21st-century Chinese people